Nelly, the Bride Without a Husband is a 1924 German silent comedy film directed by Frederic Zelnik and starring Lya Mara, Erich Kaiser-Titz and Else Berna.

The film's sets were designed by the art director Georg Meyer.

Cast
Lya Mara
Erich Kaiser-Titz
Else Berna
Olga Engl
Magnus Stifter
Anton Pointner

References

External links

Films of the Weimar Republic
German silent feature films
Films directed by Frederic Zelnik
German black-and-white films
1924 comedy films
German comedy films
Silent comedy films
1920s German films